Beaverdam Creek is a  long tributary to Crabtree Creek in Wake County, North Carolina and is classed as a 2nd order stream on the EPA waters geoviewer site.

Course
Beaverdam Creek is formed at the confluence of the Southeast and Southwest Prongs in northwestern Raleigh, North Carolina.  It then flows northeast through the Carolina Country Club to meet Crabtree Creek.  About 5% of the watershed is considered to be forested.

Watershed
Beaverdam Creek drains  of area. The confluence is at the border of felsic gneiss, but the stream then flows over Falls Leucogneiss.  The watershed receives an average of 46.6 in/year of precipitation and has a wetness index of 390.31.

See also
List of rivers of North Carolina

External links
 Beaver Dam Trail
 USGS Page on Beaverdam Creek

References

Rivers of North Carolina
Rivers of Wake County, North Carolina
Tributaries of Pamlico Sound